The Clown is a 1927 American silent crime drama film directed by William James Craft and produced and distributed by Columbia Pictures. It stars Dorothy Revier, Johnnie Walker, and William V. Mong.

The film is preserved in an Italian archive and the Library of Congress.

Cast
Dorothy Revier as Fanchon
Johnnie Walker as Bob Stone
William V. Mong as Albert Wells
John Miljan as Bert Colton
Barbara Tennant as Corinne
Charlotte Walker

References

External links

1927 films
American silent feature films
Films directed by William James Craft
Columbia Pictures films
1927 crime drama films
American crime drama films
American black-and-white films
Surviving American silent films
1920s English-language films
1920s American films
Silent American drama films